is a Japanese wrestler. He competed in the men's freestyle 87 kg at the 1968 Summer Olympics.

References

1945 births
Living people
Japanese male sport wrestlers
Olympic wrestlers of Japan
Wrestlers at the 1968 Summer Olympics
Sportspeople from Miyagi Prefecture
20th-century Japanese people